The Monument to the People's Heroes is a ten-story obelisk that was erected as a national monument of China to the martyrs of revolutionary struggle during the 19th and 20th centuries. It is located in the southern part of Tiananmen Square in Beijing, in front of the Mausoleum of Mao Zedong. The obelisk monument was built in accordance with a resolution of the First Plenary Session of the Chinese People's Political Consultative Conference adopted on November 30, 1949, with construction lasting from August 1952 to May 1958. The architect of the monument was Liang Sicheng, with some elements designed by his wife, Lin Huiyin.  The civil engineer, Chen Zhide (陈志德) was also instrumental in realizing the final product.

The monument has also served as the center of large-scale mourning activities that later developed into protest and unrest, such as the deaths of Premier Zhou Enlai (which developed into the 1976 Tiananmen Incident) and Hu Yaobang (which later developed into the 1989 Tiananmen Square protests and massacre, which was claimed as an anti-government movement by the Chinese Communist Party at that time).

Description

On the pedestal of the tablet are huge bas-reliefs depicting eight major revolutionary episodes, which can be read in chronological order in a clockwise direction from the east:
 Destruction of opium at Humen (1839), in the run-up to the First Opium War
 Jintian Uprising, the catalyst for the Taiping Revolution (1851)
 Wuchang Uprising, the catalyst for the Xinhai Revolution (1911)
 May 4th Movement (1919)
 May 30 Movement (1925)
 Nanchang Uprising (1927)
 War of Resistance Against Japan (1931-1945)
 Yangtze River Crossing Campaign of the Chinese Civil War (1949)

On the front of the monument is an inscription in Mao Zedong's handwriting, which reads, "Eternal glory to the people's heroes!".

On the back of the monument is an epitaph written by Mao Zedong:

The time framing of since the 1840s was intended to encompass the China's modern history beginning with the Opium Wars, thereby framing the period of the 1840s to the 1940s as an anti-imperialist and revolutionary century.

Commemoration

The conduct of commemoration activities at the Monument to the People's Heroes is regulated by the Major Events Administration Office of the Tiananmen Area Administrative Committee. Strict rules apply to conduct within the vicinity of the monument. Since the protests of 1989 (during which the Monument was a rallying point for the protestors), the government has prohibited climbing the monument beyond the protective barrier without prior approval, as well as photography and filming. Today, those intending to lay wreaths at the monument must apply five days in advance.

Since 1980, it has been customary for visiting foreign dignitaries, especially from historical allies of the People's Republic of China, such as post-Soviet states, to lay wreaths at the monument when visiting Beijing. Certain domestic groups, such as police and military units, would also sometimes lay wreaths at the monument.

See also

 History of Beijing
 Monument to the People's Heroes (Shanghai)
 China Millennium Monument

References

Further reading

External links

1958 sculptures
Buildings and structures in Beijing
Major National Historical and Cultural Sites in Beijing
Obelisks in China
Tiananmen Square
Tourist attractions in Beijing
World War II memorials in China
Dongcheng District, Beijing